Echinolatus is a genus of decapods belonging to the family Ovalipidae.

The species of this genus are found in Australia.

Species:

Echinolatus bullatus 
Echinolatus caledonicus 
Echinolatus poorei 
Echinolatus proximus

References

Decapods
Decapod genera